Walter Müller or Mueller may refer to:
 Walter Mueller (1894–1971), American baseball player
 Walter H. Mueller (?–2011), American politician
 Walter Müller (actor) (1911–1969), Austrian film actor
 Walter Müller (biathlete) (1940–1966), Austrian Olympic biathlete
 Walter Müller (Panzerjäger) (1914–2003), German army officer
 Walter Müller (footballer, born 1970) (born 1970), Swiss footballer
 Walter Müller (footballer, born 1920) (1920–2010), Swiss footballer
 Walter Müller (footballer, born 1910) (1910–?), Swiss footballer
 Walter Müller (German gymnast) (1930–2021), German Olympic gymnast
 Walter Müller (Swiss gymnast) (born 1940), Swiss Olympic gymnast
 Walter Müller (handballer) (born 1957), Swiss handballer
 Walter Andreas Müller (born 1945), Swiss stage and film actor 
 Walter W. Müller (born 1933), German specialist in ancient South Arabia and Semitic epigraphy
 Walter Müller (writer), Austrian writer, winner of an award at the 1979 Festival of German-Language Literature